Buug, officially the Municipality of Buug (Chavacano: Municipalidad de Buug), is a 3rd class municipality in the province of Zamboanga Sibugay, Philippines. According to the 2020 census, it has a population of 38,425 people.

Etymology
The name Buug was derived from the word bog, a Subanen word for secondary forest which is the same as the Cebuano-Visayan term buog. Accordingly, a group of Subanens stumbled upon this bog that was endowed with a stream and sufficient supply of water while they were moving from one place to another in search of a safe place to start a living away from marauders who were in search for slaves and things to loot. From then on people began to refer to the bog as Buug.

History

Buug grew into a thriving community through the initiative of the timuays, the Subanen chieftains, who held leadership of the community. A school was opened which drew in the first trickle of Subanon, Cebuano, and other Visayan settlers. When the Samar Mining Company (SAMICO) opened the Sibuguey project in 1957 at Bobuan (now part of the municipality of Bayog), the next group of settlers flooded in. More people came when the Pagadian-Zamboanga National Highway reached Buug in 1958. The highway is part of the Pan-Philippine Highway (also known as the Maharlika Highway and AH26).

Buug was originally a barangay of the municipality of Margosatubig and became a baranggay of Malangas when the former was divided in 1951. It became a municipality through Executive Order No. 380 issued by President Carlos P. Garcia on February 2, 1960. Instrumental in the formation of Municipality of Buug was the persistence of Mr. Quirino M. Gonzales, a fisherman who also was a councilor of Malangas and a native of Merida, Leyte. He is also a distant relative of then Senator Neptali Gonzales. Gonzales became the first appointed mayor and was called the "Father of Buug". After being proclaimed as a municipality, flocks of settlers established residence and trade in the place.

Geography
Buug is located in the central Zamboanga Peninsula, on the island of Mindanao. It has a pentagon-like shape bounded on the south by Dumanquilas Bay, Bayog on the north, Kumalarang on the east, Diplahan on the west, and Malangas on south-west.

Climate

It is away from the typhoon belt and enjoying a Type IV climate, i.e. rainfall is more or less evenly distributed throughout the year.

Barangays
Buug belongs to the first district of Zamboanga Sibugay. The local executive council is administered by a mayor. The legislative council is headed by a vice mayor with ten municipal councilors as members, eight of which are elected, plus the representative of Sangguniang Kabataan and the president of the Association of Barangay Captains (ABC). It is politically subdivided into 27 barangays.

Demographics

Economy

Credit institutions and commercial businesses have multiplied. Appliance centers and merchandisers with main branches in big cities have invested in the area. Cottage industries have also sprouted. Buug's economy is based on two sectors categorized by the local government:
 Agriculture which consists of farming, livestock & poultry, and fisheries.
 Service Activities such as trade/commerce & industry, finance, personal and community service.

Education

There are two higher education institutions in Buug. Mindanao State University- Buug  offers courses in education, agriculture, fisheries, liberal arts, information technology, hospitality industry, environmental science, etc. It also has a high school which serves as the laboratory school of the College of Education. St. John College of Buug Foundation, Inc. the only private college which offers courses criminology and business administration. A private high school managed by the Sisters of St. Paul of Chartres is also located here, the St. Paul School (formerly Holy Trinity Academy) which offers primary and high school education. The first high school which opened in Buug is a Gabaldon school called Western Mindanao Institute, a private school. Public high schools are also present such as the Buug National High School (which opened in 1996) located in Barangay Manlin and Del Monte National High School.

References

External links

 Buug Profile at PhilAtlas.com
Official Website of the Municipality of Buug
 [ Philippine Standard Geographic Code]
Philippine Census Information

Municipalities of Zamboanga Sibugay
Establishments by Philippine executive order